Bangaly Fofana (born 3 June 1989) is a French professional basketball player for ALM Évreux Basket of the LNB Pro B. Standing at 2.13 m (7 ft 0 in), Fofana usually plays as center.

Professional career
On 30 June 2016 Fofana signed a 2-year contract with AS Monaco.

On 30 March 2021 he signed with JL Bourg of LNB Pro A. On 9 October, Fofana signed with Orléans Loiret Basket. On 14 December, he signed with ALM Évreux Basket.

References

1989 births
Living people
AS Monaco Basket players
ASVEL Basket players
Basketball players from Paris
BCM Gravelines players
Centers (basketball)
French expatriate basketball people in Monaco
French men's basketball players
JL Bourg-en-Bresse players
SIG Basket players
STB Le Havre players